Neomicroxus is a genus of grass mice. Both species were placed in the genus Akodon. There are two living species:

 N. bogotensis Bogotá grass mouse
 N. latebricola Ecuadorian grass mouse.

References

 
Rodent genera